Drzonów is a village in western Poland, in the administrative district of Świdnica, within Zielona Góra County, Lubusz Voivodeship. The village is home to the Lubusz Military Museum, housing numerous historical tanks, self-propelled anti-tank guns and aeroplanes. Among the historical landmarks of the village are 19th-century church and a palace.

Until 1945 part of Germany, following World War II it was transferred to Poland as part of the war reparations. Most of the local inhabitants have been resettled to within post-war Germany, while the village itself was repopulated with Poles, mostly people expelled by the Soviet Union from the village of Rychcice near Lwów (modern Lvov, Ukraine).

References

External links
 Lubuskie Military Museum

Villages in Zielona Góra County